Yanachaga–Chemillén National Park is a protected area located in the region of Pasco, Peru. It preserves part of the rainforests and cloud forests of central Peru.

Ecology

Flora 
Forests occupy almost all the area, except for high mountain grasslands. Plant species found in the area include: Retrophyllum rospigliosii, Oenocarpus bataua, Podocarpus oleifolius, Euterpe precatoria, Cedrela odorata, Juglans neotropica, Clarisia racemosa, Phytelephas macrocarpa, Weinmannia spp., Calycophyllum spruceanum, Gynerium sagittatum, etc.

Fauna
Mammals found in the park include: the capybara, the jaguar, the puma, the white tailed deer, the spectacled bear, the jaguarundi, etc.

The frog Ctenophryne barbatula is known only from the Yanachaga–Chemillén National Park.

References

External links 

 Profile at protectedplanet.net

National parks of Peru
Protected areas established in 1961
Geography of Pasco Region
Tourist attractions in Pasco Region